Marinococcus luteus is a Gram-positive, aerobic and motile bacterium from the genus of Marinococcus which has been isolated from the Barkol Lake in Xinjiang in China.

References

 

Bacillaceae
Bacteria described in 2009